The former St. Francis Seminary is an historic building located at 10290 Mill Road in Springfield Township in the northern suburbs of Cincinnati, Ohio, United States.  On March 5, 1999, it was listed on the National Register of Historic Places. It is now a Franciscan retirement community named Mercy Franciscan at Winton Woods.

Historic uses 
Religious Structure
Church School
Church Related Residence

History
The Franciscan Friars of St. Leopold Province in the Austrian Tyrol arrived in Cincinnati in 1844. They had been recruited by Archbishop John Baptist Purcell to serve German-speaking Catholics in the Over-the-Rhine area. In 1858 the friars opened St. Franziskus Gymnasium, a high school at Liberty and Vine. It later relocated north of Mt. Healthy and was renamed St. Francis Seminary.

Actor Tom Cruise attended the seminary "for two years in the early 1980s" according to the Columbus Dispatch.

References

External links
 History of the former St. Francis Seminary

Properties of religious function on the National Register of Historic Places in Ohio
Buildings and structures in Hamilton County, Ohio
National Register of Historic Places in Hamilton County, Ohio
1923 establishments in Ohio
Buildings and structures completed in 1923